Whitefield's Tabernacle, a church in Penn Street, Bristol, opened in 1753 for the followers of George Whitefield.

It was replaced in 1957 by the Whitefield Memorial Tabernacle, in Muller Road, Horfield, Bristol, now the home of Horfield United Reformed Church.  The work in Muller Road had started in 1930, but larger buildings were facilitated by compensation by Bristol City Council for the redevelopment of the site of the Penn Street church.

External links
 Horfield URC homepage
 Picture and description of Horfield church on photo page of Congregational churches in Bristol

Churches in Bristol
1753 establishments in England
Religious organizations established in 1753
18th-century Methodist church buildings
United Reformed churches in England